Bret Curtis is an American auto racing driver and business entrepreneur.  Bret Curtis founded Spectra Resources in 2002 and United Steel Supply in 2007. Curtis has been racing since 2009, and currently competes in the WeatherTech SportsCar Championship series for Turner Motorsport driving a BMW M6 GT3.  Curtis has competed around the world in some of the most prestigious endurance races including 24 hours of Le Mans, 24 hours of Daytona, Spa 24 hours, Dubai 24 hour; 12 hours of Sebring, Bathurst 12 Hour; Petit Le Mans; and the 6 hours of Laguna Seca.  Curtis placed second overall in the 2012 Bathurst 12 Hour driving for Erebus Racing/Black Falcon.  Curtis placed second in the P2 class at the 2012 12 Hours of Sebring driving an LMP2 class Lola for Black Swan Racing. Curtis won the GTC class at the 2012 Six Hours of Laguna at Mazda Laguna Raceway. Curtis also competed in 2012 for Black Falcon Racing in the 2012 Blancpain Endurance Championship driving a Mercedes SLS GT3.  Bret Curtis also contested the 2012 24 Hours of Le Mans in the GTE class for Prospeed, driving a Porsche 911 RSR (997). Curtis placed 6th in the GTD class of the WeatherTech SportsCar championship in 2016 with a win at MOSPORT and a win at the Circuit of the Americas and a second place at the 12 hours of Sebring.

Complete 24 Hours of Le Mans results

Complete WeatherTech SportsCar Championship results
(key) (Races in bold indicate pole position; results in italics indicate fastest lap)

References

1966 births
Living people
Racing drivers from Pennsylvania
24 Hours of Daytona drivers
24 Hours of Le Mans drivers
24 Hours of Spa drivers
American Le Mans Series drivers
Blancpain Endurance Series drivers
Rolex Sports Car Series drivers
24H Series drivers
GT World Challenge America drivers

AF Corse drivers
FIA World Endurance Championship drivers